Louis William Bergesch (June 17, 1921 – May 10, 2011) was an American Major League Baseball executive. Beginning as a minor league manager and scouting director in the St. Louis Cardinals organization, he would serve in a variety of management and front office roles over a career spanning almost five decades, except for a brief period spent as president of one of the first professional soccer league teams to be established in the United States, the New York Generals. Returning to baseball however, Bergesch would ultimately serve as a senior front office executive or general manager for several major league teams, including most prominently, the Cincinnati Reds and the New York Yankees.

Early life
He was a native of St. Louis, Missouri.  He attended Washington University in St. Louis prior to Pearl Harbor, but joined the U.S. Army in 1942.  He served in the First Special Service Force, a unit trained for specialized assault and mountain combat, and a precursor to the U.S. Army Green Berets. He obtained the non-commissioned rank of Platoon Sergeant, and served in combat in North Africa, Sicily, and Italy. In North Africa, he landed as part of the Operation Torch landings, and received his first Purple Heart. Later, he landed at Salerno, as part of Operation Avalanche. He was again wounded, this time seriously, during the disastrous attempted crossing of the Gari (river) known as the Battle of Rapido River in January, 1944, that battle occurring in the opening stages of the larger, simultaneous Battle of Monte Cassino, which continued until May.  Bergesch received a second Purple Heart. He was, however, paralyzed on the right side of his body for a substantial period of time. 

He was returned to the U.S. and was discharged from service 15 June 1944.  He then returned to Washington University, where he graduated in 1946, with a bachelor’s degree in business administration. Bergesch was admitted to and briefly attended Washington University School of Law, but withdrew after less than one full academic year, in order to pursue other opportunities in professional baseball management. 

In his career at Washington University, both before and after World War II, he played varsity football, basketball, and track. Attempting to return to playing football post-war, Bergesch made the team, but due to his injury was unable to complete the season, re-injuring his shoulder in the fourth game of the season playing against Ohio State University. Similarly, although also attempting to return to playing basketball after the war, he found he was unable to raise his right arm to shoot. Bergesch taught himself to play left-handed, made the team and continued to play, and was named team captain in his senior year. He married Virginia Kammerer, another graduate of Washington University and St. Louis native, in 1947.

Baseball career
In 1947, Bergesch joined the St. Louis Cardinals organization. He was sent to Albany, Georgia to serve as general manager of a local franchise team owned by the Cardinals. For the next decade, he served in similar roles with other St. Louis Cardinal minor league teams, including the Omaha Cardinals, one of two AAA teams in the Cardinals minor league system. While at Omaha, Bergesch signed future Hall of Fame pitcher Bob Gibson, from Creighton University

Bergesch was called to the St Louis head office in 1960. In 1961 he joined the joining the Kansas City Athletics, which had recently been purchased by Charles O. Finley, as Assistant General Manager to Frank Lane. In 1962 Bergesch joined the New York Mets prior to their first season, as Assistant General Manager and Director of Minor League Operations; where he was largely responsible for building a farm system for the new team.

First Tenure With the Yankees
In 1964, Bergesch joined the New York Yankees as Stadium Manager.  Prior to the beginning of the season, the Yankees' Traveling Secretary Bruce Henry was stricken with a serious illness; as a result, Bergesch was given the additional responsibilities until Henry's return late in the season. He remained with the Yankees during the CBS era through 1968.

Professional Soccer
He became President of the New York Generals, the New York franchise of the first professional soccer league in the US, in 1968. The soccer league played for two seasons, then was disbanded in favor of the North American Soccer League (NASL). Bergesch at this point moved to the New York Cosmos soccer team where his greatest accomplishment was to be the successful signing of Brazilian soccer legend Pelé out of semi-retirement to play in America for the New York Cosmos.

Second Tenure With the Yankees
Bergesch rejoined the Yankees in 1977 as Director of Scouting. He was promoted to Vice President of Baseball Operations – and served in actuality as General Manager in 1983, although he formally retained the previous title. Bergesch received 1977 and 1978 World Series rings from this period of engagement with the Yankees.

Cincinnati Reds
He left the Yankees in 1984, moving to Cincinnati as Executive Vice President and General Manager of the Cincinnati Reds. In 1984 the Reds finished 5th in the NL west, but finished 2nd in 1985, 1986, and 1987. During his tenure, Pete Rose was the field Manager, but was also a listed as a player on the Reds roster through the 1986 season, when he set the all-time MLB record for base hits. Bergesch attempted to build the team around a core of highly regarded young players, in addition to veterans like Dave Parker and Terry Francona. However, he was unable to capitalize on an excess of young and highly touted position players including Kurt Stillwell, Tracy Jones, and Kal Daniels by trading them for pitching. Despite the emergence of Tom Browning as Rookie of the Year in 1985, winning 20 games, the rotation was devastated by the early demise of Mario Soto's career to arm injury.  Bergesch was fired just prior to Spring training in 1988.

Final Tenure With the Yankees
Bergesch rejoined the Yankees in 1991, first on a consulting basis, and then more formally, although his responsibilities were only loosely defined. Bill Madden in his book "Steinbrenner" depicts Bergesch as having a backroom advisory presence during this period, which set the stage for the Yankees' periods of dominance later in the decade. Bergesch received a third World Series ring for the 1996 season, and formally retired in early 1997.

Later life
Bergesch continued to attend Yankees Spring Training in Tampa, Florida, through the year 2008. After the death of his wife Virginia in 2006, he moved to a retirement community in Stamford, Connecticut. Bergesch died on May 10, 2011, approximately a month before his 90th birthday.

References

External links
Baseball America.com page

1921 births
2011 deaths
Cincinnati Reds executives
Kansas City Athletics personnel
Major League Baseball executives
Major League Baseball general managers
New York Mets executives
New York Yankees executives
Washington University School of Law alumni
Olin Business School (Washington University) alumni